Kakehashi (written: 梯 lit. "suspension bridge") is a Japanese surname. Notable people with the surname include:

 (born 1930), Japanese businessman

See also
, river in Komatsu, Ishikawa Prefecture, Japan

Japanese-language surnames